In mathematics, the infinite series  is an elementary example of a geometric series that converges absolutely.  The sum of the series is 1.
In summation notation, this may be expressed as

The series is related to philosophical questions considered in antiquity, particularly to Zeno's paradoxes.

Proof
 
As with any infinite series, the sum

is defined to mean the limit of the partial sum of the first  terms 

as  approaches infinity.
By various arguments, one can show that this finite sum is equal to

As  approaches infinity, the term  approaches 0 and so  tends to 1.

History

Zeno's paradox
This series was used as a representation of many of Zeno's paradoxes.  For example, in the paradox of Achilles and the Tortoise, the warrior Achilles was to race against a tortoise. The track is 100 meters long. Achilles could run at 10 m/s, while the tortoise only 5. The tortoise, with a 10-meter advantage, Zeno argued, would win. Achilles would have to move 10 meters to catch up to the tortoise, but the tortoise would already have moved another five meters by then. Achilles would then have to move 5 meters, where the tortoise would move 2.5 meters, and so on. Zeno argued that the tortoise would always remain ahead of Achilles.

The Dichotomy paradox also states that to move a certain distance, you have to move half of it, then half of the remaining distance, and so on, therefore having infinitely many time intervals. This can be easily resolved by noting that each time interval is a term of the infinite geometric series, and will sum to a finite number.

The Eye of Horus
The parts of the Eye of Horus were once thought to represent the first six summands of the series.

In a myriad ages it will not be exhausted
A version of the series appears in the ancient Taoist book Zhuangzi. The miscellaneous chapters "All Under Heaven" include the following sentence: "Take a chi long stick and remove half every day, in a myriad ages it will not be exhausted."

See also
0.999...
1/2 − 1/4 + 1/8 − 1/16 + ⋯
Actual infinity

Notes

References

Geometric series
1 (number)